Minolia punctata is a species of sea snail, a marine gastropod mollusk in the family Solariellidae.

Description
The length of the shell varies between 7 mm and 13 mm. The helicoid shell is widely umbilicated, fulvous, punctate with red. The 6½ whorls are convex and somewhat loosely rolled on themselves which causes the sutures to very deep. They are traversed by spiral granulose cinguli ornamented with red dots, and alternately larger and smaller. The interstices are beautifully clathrate with delicate oblique lamellae. The body whorl is at the peristome almost disunited from the penultimate whorl. The suture is canaliculate. The umbilicus is perspective, with concentric granulose cinguli. The interstices are closely clathrate.

Distribution
This species occurs in the Western Pacific and off Japan.

References

External links
 To Barcode of Life (1 barcode)
 To Biodiversity Heritage Library (6 publications)
 To Encyclopedia of Life
 To GenBank (2 nucleotides; 2 proteins)
 To World Register of Marine Species
 

punctata
Gastropods described in 1860